Cristian Quiñones (born 3 November 1991) is a Colombian footballer who last played for the Fort Lauderdale Strikers of the North American Soccer League. His owners, Traffic Sports, are in the process of placing Quiñones at a club.

Career
On 22 June 2011, Atlanta Silverbacks acquired Quiñones from Fort Lauderdale Strikers on a season-long loan. Quiñones received his first cap for Atlanta with a start on 30 July 2011 in a rain-shortened match against Carolina RailHawks FC. Quiñones was recalled by Fort Lauderdale on 19 August 2011. Quiñones left the Strikers on 17 February 2012.

References

External links
Atlanta Silverbacks bio

1991 births
Living people
Colombian footballers
Colombian expatriate footballers
Independiente Santa Fe footballers
Fort Lauderdale Strikers players
Atlanta Silverbacks players
Expatriate soccer players in the United States
Colombian expatriate sportspeople in the United States
North American Soccer League players
People from Tumaco
Association football defenders
Sportspeople from Nariño Department